The 1922 Ole Miss Rebels football team represented the University of Mississippi during the 1922 college football season. The season was the team's first in the Southern Conference and first under head coach Roland Cowell.

Schedule

References

Ole Miss
Ole Miss Rebels football seasons
Ole Miss Rebels football